This is a list of the Canadian electoral districts used between 2003 and 2013.  During this period, the House of Commons of Canada had 308 seats.  This arrangement was used in the 2004 federal election, the 2006 federal election, the 2008 federal election and the 2011 federal election.

Alberta — 28 seats

Calgary Centre (Calgary South Centre before 2004)
Calgary Centre-North (Calgary North Centre before 2004)
Calgary East
Calgary Northeast
Calgary—Nose Hill
Calgary Southeast
Calgary Southwest
Calgary West
Crowfoot
Edmonton Centre
Edmonton East
Edmonton—Leduc
Edmonton—Mill Woods—Beaumont (Edmonton—Beaumont before 2004)
Edmonton—St. Albert
Edmonton—Sherwood Park
Edmonton—Spruce Grove
Edmonton—Strathcona
Fort McMurray—Athabasca (Athabasca before 2004)
Lethbridge
Macleod
Medicine Hat
Peace River
Red Deer
Vegreville—Wainwright
Westlock—St. Paul (briefly Battle River in 2004-2005)
Wetaskiwin
Wild Rose
Yellowhead

British Columbia — 36 seats
Abbotsford
British Columbia Southern Interior (Southern Interior before 2004)
Burnaby—Douglas
Burnaby—New Westminster
Cariboo—Prince George
Chilliwack—Fraser Canyon
Delta—Richmond East
Esquimalt—Juan de Fuca
Fleetwood—Port Kells
Kamloops—Thompson—Cariboo (Kamloops—Thompson before 2004)
Kelowna—Lake Country (Kelowna before 2004)
Kootenay—Columbia
Langley
Nanaimo—Alberni
Nanaimo—Cowichan
Newton—North Delta
New Westminster—Coquitlam
North Vancouver
Okanagan—Coquihalla
Okanagan—Shuswap (North Okanagan—Shuswap before 2004)
Pitt Meadows—Maple Ridge—Mission (Dewdney—Alouette before 2004)
Port Moody—Westwood—Port Coquitlam
Prince George—Peace River
Richmond
Saanich—Gulf Islands
Skeena—Bulkley Valley
South Surrey—White Rock—Cloverdale
Surrey North
Vancouver Centre
Vancouver East
Vancouver Island North
Vancouver Kingsway
Vancouver Quadra
Vancouver South
Victoria
West Vancouver—Sunshine Coast—Sea to Sky Country (West Vancouver—Sunshine Coast before 2004)

Manitoba — 14 seats
Brandon—Souris
Charleswood—St. James—Assiniboia (Charleswood—St. James before 2004)
Churchill
Dauphin—Swan River—Marquette (Dauphin—Swan River before 2004)
Elmwood—Transcona
Kildonan—St. Paul
Portage—Lisgar
Provencher
Saint Boniface
Selkirk—Interlake
Winnipeg Centre
Winnipeg North
Winnipeg South
Winnipeg South Centre

New Brunswick — 10 seats
Acadie—Bathurst
Beauséjour
Fredericton
Fundy Royal (Fundy before 2004)
Madawaska—Restigouche
Miramichi
Moncton—Riverview—Dieppe
New Brunswick Southwest (St. Croix—Belleisle before 2004)
Saint John
Tobique—Mactaquac

Newfoundland and Labrador — 7 seats
Avalon
Bonavista—Gander—Grand Falls—Windsor (Bonavista—Exploits before 2004)
Humber—St. Barbe—Baie Verte
Labrador
Random—Burin—St. George's
St. John's East (St. John's North before 2004)
St. John's South—Mount Pearl (St. John's South before 2004)

Northwest Territories - 1 seat
Northwest Territories (Western Arctic until 2014)

Nova Scotia — 11 seats
Cape Breton—Canso
Central Nova
Cumberland—Colchester—Musquodoboit Valley (North Nova before 2004)
Dartmouth—Cole Harbour
Halifax
Halifax West
Kings—Hants
Sackville—Eastern Shore
South Shore—St. Margaret's
Sydney—Victoria
West Nova

Nunavut — 1 seat
Nunavut

Ontario — 106 seats
Ajax—Pickering
Algoma—Manitoulin—Kapuskasing
Ancaster—Dundas—Flamborough—Westdale
Barrie
Beaches—East York
Bramalea—Gore—Malton
Brampton—Springdale
Brampton West
Brant
Bruce—Grey—Owen Sound (Grey—Bruce—Owen Sound before 2004)
Burlington
Cambridge
Carleton—Mississippi Mills (Carleton—Lanark before 2004)
Chatham-Kent—Essex
Davenport
Don Valley East
Don Valley West
Dufferin—Caledon
Durham (Clarington—Scugog—Uxbridge before 2004)
Eglinton—Lawrence
Elgin—Middlesex—London
Essex
Etobicoke Centre
Etobicoke—Lakeshore
Etobicoke North
Glengarry—Prescott—Russell
Guelph
Haldimand—Norfolk
Haliburton—Kawartha Lakes—Brock
Halton
Hamilton Centre
Hamilton East—Stoney Creek
Hamilton Mountain
Huron—Bruce
Kenora
Kingston and the Islands
Kitchener Centre
Kitchener—Conestoga (briefly Kitchener—Wilmot—Wellesley—Woolwich in 2004-2005)
Kitchener—Waterloo
Lambton—Kent—Middlesex (Middlesex—Kent—Lambton before 2004)
Lanark—Frontenac—Lennox and Addington
Leeds—Grenville
London—Fanshawe
London North Centre
London West
Markham—Unionville
Mississauga—Brampton South
Mississauga East—Cooksville
Mississauga—Erindale
Mississauga South
Mississauga—Streetsville
Nepean—Carleton
Newmarket—Aurora
Niagara Falls
Niagara West—Glanbrook
Nickel Belt
Nipissing—Timiskaming
Northumberland—Quinte West
Oak Ridges—Markham
Oakville
Oshawa
Ottawa Centre
Ottawa—Orléans
Ottawa South
Ottawa—Vanier
Ottawa West—Nepean
Oxford
Parkdale—High Park
Parry Sound—Muskoka
Perth—Wellington
Peterborough
Pickering—Scarborough East
Prince Edward—Hastings
Renfrew—Nipissing—Pembroke
Richmond Hill
St. Catharines
St. Paul's
Sarnia—Lambton
Sault Ste. Marie
Scarborough—Agincourt
Scarborough Centre
Scarborough—Guildwood
Scarborough—Rouge River
Scarborough Southwest
Simcoe—Grey
Simcoe North
Stormont—Dundas—South Glengarry
Sudbury
Thornhill
Thunder Bay—Rainy River
Thunder Bay—Superior North
Timmins—James Bay
Toronto Centre
Toronto—Danforth
Trinity—Spadina
Vaughan
Welland
Wellington—Halton Hills
Whitby—Oshawa
Willowdale
Windsor—Tecumseh
Windsor West
York Centre
York—Simcoe
York South—Weston
York West

Prince Edward Island — 4 seats
Cardigan
Charlottetown
Egmont
Malpeque

Quebec — 75 seats
Abitibi—Baie-James—Nunavik—Eeyou (Nunavik—Eeyou before 2004)
Abitibi—Témiscamingue
Ahuntsic
Alfred-Pellan
Argenteuil—Papineau—Mirabel (Argenteuil—Mirabel before 2004)
Bas-Richelieu—Nicolet—Bécancour (Richelieu before 2004)
Beauce
Beauharnois—Salaberry
Beauport—Limoilou (Beauport before 2004)
Berthier—Maskinongé
Bourassa
Brome—Missisquoi
Brossard—La Prairie
Chambly—Borduas
Charlesbourg—Haute-Saint-Charles (Charlesbourg before 2004)
Châteauguay—Saint-Constant
Chicoutimi—Le Fjord
Compton—Stanstead
Drummond
Gaspésie—Îles-de-la-Madeleine
Gatineau
Haute-Gaspésie—La Mitis—Matane—Matapédia (Matapédia—Matane before 2004)
Hochelaga
Honoré-Mercier
Hull—Aylmer
Jeanne-Le Ber
Joliette
Jonquière—Alma
La Pointe-de-l'Île
Lac-Saint-Louis
LaSalle—Émard
Laurentides—Labelle
Laurier—Sainte-Marie (Laurier before 2004)
Laval
Laval—Les Îles
Lévis—Bellechasse
Longueuil—Pierre-Boucher (Longueuil before 2004)
Lotbinière—Chutes-de-la-Chaudière
Louis-Hébert
Louis-Saint-Laurent
Manicouagan
Marc-Aurèle-Fortin
Mégantic—L'Érable
Montcalm
Montmagny—L'Islet—Kamouraska—Rivière-du-Loup (Rivière-du-Loup—Montmagny before 2004)
Montmorency—Charlevoix—Haute-Côte-Nord (Charlevoix—Montmorency before 2004)
Mount Royal
Notre-Dame-de-Grâce—Lachine
Outremont
Papineau
Pierrefonds—Dollard
Pontiac
Portneuf—Jacques-Cartier (Portneuf before 2004)
Québec
Repentigny
Richmond—Arthabaska
Rimouski-Neigette—Témiscouata—Les Basques (Rimouski—Témiscouata before 2004)
Rivière-des-Mille-Îles
Rivière-du-Nord
Roberval—Lac-Saint-Jean (Roberval before 2004)
Rosemont—La Petite-Patrie
Saint-Bruno—Saint-Hubert
Saint-Hyacinthe—Bagot
Saint-Jean
Saint-Lambert
Saint-Laurent—Cartierville
Saint-Léonard—Saint-Michel
Saint-Maurice—Champlain
Shefford
Sherbrooke
Terrebonne—Blainville
Trois-Rivières
Vaudreuil-Soulanges
Verchères—Les Patriotes
Westmount—Ville-Marie

Saskatchewan — 14 seats
Battlefords—Lloydminster
Blackstrap
Cypress Hills—Grasslands
Desnethé—Missinippi—Churchill River (Churchill River before 2004)
Palliser
Prince Albert
Regina—Lumsden—Lake Centre
Regina—Qu'Appelle
Saskatoon—Humboldt
Saskatoon—Rosetown—Biggar
Saskatoon—Wanuskewin
Souris—Moose Mountain
Wascana
Yorkton—Melville

Yukon — 1 seat
Yukon

2003-2013